Same-sex unions are currently not recognized in Honduras. Since 2005, the Constitution of Honduras has explicitly banned same-sex marriage. In January 2022, the Supreme Court dismissed a challenge to this ban, but a request for the Inter-American Commission on Human Rights to review whether the ban violates the American Convention on Human Rights is pending. A same-sex marriage bill was introduced to Congress in May 2022.

Legal history

Background
In 2005, the Constitution of Honduras was amended to expressly ban same-sex marriage and civil unions. The constitutional amendment also forbids the recognition of same-sex marriages or unions that occurred legally in other countries. It also prohibits same-sex couples from adopting. Article 112 reads: "The right of a man and a woman to contract marriage is recognized, as well as the legal equality of spouses. [...] Marriage and de facto unions between persons of the same sex are prohibited. Marriages and de facto unions between persons of the same sex celebrated or recognized under the laws of other countries shall not be valid in Honduras." In January 2021, the National Congress of Honduras passed a constitutional amendment banning abortion under any circumstance and establishing that future modifications of the articles on abortion and marriage require approval by three-quarters of Congress rather than two-thirds. Human Rights Watch opposed the amendment, saying that it "contravene[s] constitutional and international obligations to protect and guarantee human rights."

Before the November 2017 elections, three candidates running in the Francisco Morazán Department for the National Party and the Christian Democratic Party announced their support for same-sex marriage, adding that they would be open to introducing a same-sex marriage bill to the National Congress. However, none of the three candidates won a seat in the National Congress. On 12 October 2018, President Juan Orlando Hernández told reporters at a press conference, "Personally as a Christian, I am against marriage of persons of the same sex; obviously, it is the judiciary that, according to Honduran law, has to rule on it. [Regardless of sexual preferences] people should be treated with dignity, no matter what their inclination. People should be treated with dignity and this issue is very important."

2018 Inter-American Court of Human Rights ruling

On 9 January 2018, in advisory opinion OC 24/7, the Inter-American Court of Human Rights (IACHR) ruled that countries signatory to the American Convention on Human Rights are required to allow same-sex couples to marry. The ruling states that:

Honduras ratified the American Convention on Human Rights on 8 September 1977 and recognized the court's jurisdiction on 9 September 1981. The ruling set binding precedent in favour of same-sex marriage for Hondurian courts. In May 2018, a group of LGBT activists filed a lawsuit with the Supreme Court to legalise same-sex marriage in Honduras and recognize same-sex marriages validly performed in other countries. A second case was filed shortly thereafter but was dismissed on technical grounds in November 2018. In February 2019, it was reported that the Supreme Court was expected to rule on the case within "the next few days", but it was later announced in May 2019 that they were "expected to rule later this year". The court ruled in January 2022 that same-sex marriages violate the Constitution of Honduras and the Family Code, and dismissed the case.

In September 2022, members of Somos CDC Honduras (Centro para el Desarrollo y la Cooperación LGBTI), the non-profit organization that filed the lawsuit in 2018, asked the Inter-American Commission on Human Rights to review Honduras' same-sex marriage ban.

2022 same-sex marriage bill
In May 2022, José Manuel Rodríguez Rosales, a deputy from the governing Liberty and Refoundation party, introduced a same-sex marriage bill to the National Congress. The bill was quickly opposed by religious organizations. The president of the Tegucigalpa Pastors' Association, Gerardo Irías, called the bill an "aberration in God's eyes" and urged President Xiomara Castro to oppose "immoral laws". The bill has been under discussion since 24 May 2022. In December 2022, the Minister of Human Rights, Natalie Roque, said that the legalization of same-sex marriage was "not on the agenda" of the Castro Administration.

Public opinion
According to a Pew Research Center survey conducted between 9 November and 19 December 2013, 13% of Hondurans supported same-sex marriage, while 83% were opposed. According to the 2017 AmericasBarometer, 19% of Hondurans supported same-sex marriage.

A 2018 CID-Gallup poll found that 75% of Hondurans opposed same-sex marriage, while 17% were in favor and the remaining did not know or refused to answer.

See also
LGBT rights in Honduras
Recognition of same-sex unions in the Americas

Notes

References

LGBT rights in Honduras
Honduras